Jorge Antonio Urreta Merino (born 8 June 1950 in Mexico City) is a Mexican former freestyle swimmer who competed in the 1968 Summer Olympics and in the 1972 Summer Olympics.

References

1950 births
Living people
Swimmers from Mexico City
Mexican male freestyle swimmers
Olympic swimmers of Mexico
Swimmers at the 1968 Summer Olympics
Swimmers at the 1972 Summer Olympics
Pan American Games competitors for Mexico
Swimmers at the 1971 Pan American Games
Central American and Caribbean Games gold medalists for Mexico
Competitors at the 1970 Central American and Caribbean Games
Central American and Caribbean Games medalists in swimming
20th-century Mexican people